The appendix (or vermiform appendix; also cecal [or caecal] appendix; vermix; or vermiform process) is a finger-like, blind-ended tube connected to the cecum, from which it develops in the embryo. The cecum is a pouch-like structure of the large intestine, located at the junction of the small and the large intestines. The term "vermiform" comes from Latin and means "worm-shaped". The appendix was once considered a vestigial organ, but this view has changed since the early 2000s. Research suggests that the appendix may serve an important purpose as a reservoir for beneficial gut bacteria.

Structure 

The appendix is usually located in the lower right quadrant of the abdomen, near the right hip bone. The base of the appendix is located  beneath the ileocecal valve that separates the large intestine from the small intestine. Its position within the abdomen corresponds to a point on the surface known as McBurney's point.

The appendix is connected to the mesentery in the lower region of the ileum, by a short region of the mesocolon known as the mesoappendix.

Variation
Some identical twins—known as mirror image twins—can have a mirror-imaged anatomy, a congenital condition with the appendix located in the lower left quadrant of the abdomen instead of the lower right. Intestinal malrotation may also cause displacement of the appendix to the left side.

The prevalence of the different positions varies amongst populations with the retrocecal position being most common in Ghana and Sudan, with 67.3% and 58.3% occurrence respectively, in comparison to Iran and Bosnia where the pelvic position is most common, with 55.8% and 57.7% occurrence respectively.

In very rare cases, the appendix may not be present at all (laparotomies for suspected appendicitis have given a frequency of 1 in 100,000).

Sometimes there is a semi-circular fold of mucous membrane at the opening of the appendix. This valve of the vermiform appendix is also called Gerlach's valve.

Functions

Maintaining gut flora

Although it has been long accepted that the immune tissue surrounding the appendix and elsewhere in the gut—called gut-associated lymphoid tissue—carries out a number of important functions, explanations were lacking for the distinctive shape of the appendix and its apparent lack of specific importance and function as judged by an absence of side effects following its removal. Therefore, the notion that the appendix is only vestigial became widely held.

William Parker, Randy Bollinger, and colleagues at Duke University proposed in 2007 that the appendix serves as a haven for useful bacteria when illness flushes the bacteria from the rest of the intestines. This proposition is based on an understanding that emerged by the early 2000s of how the immune system supports the growth of beneficial intestinal bacteria, in combination with many well-known features of the appendix, including its architecture, its location just below the normal one-way flow of food and germs in the large intestine, and its association with copious amounts of immune tissue. Research performed at Winthrop–University Hospital showed that individuals without an appendix were four times as likely to have a recurrence of Clostridium difficile colitis. The appendix, therefore, may act as a "safe house" for beneficial bacteria. This reservoir of bacteria could then serve to repopulate the gut flora in the digestive system following a bout of dysentery or cholera or to boost it following a milder gastrointestinal illness.

Immune and lymphatic systems
The appendix has been identified as an important component of mammalian mucosal immune function, particularly B cell-mediated immune responses and extrathymically derived T cells. This structure helps in the proper movement and removal of waste matter in the digestive system, contains lymphatic vessels that regulate pathogens, and lastly, might even produce early defences that prevent deadly diseases. Additionally, it is thought that this may provide more immune defences from invading pathogens and getting the lymphatic system's B and T cells to fight the viruses and bacteria that infect that portion of the bowel and training them so that immune responses are targeted and more able to reliably and less dangerously fight off pathogens. In addition, there are different immune cells called innate lymphoid cells that function in the gut in order to help the appendix maintain digestive health. Research also shows a positive correlation between the existence of the appendix and the concentration of cecal lymphoid tissue, which supports the suggestion that not only does the appendix evolve as a complex with the cecum but also has major immune benefits.

Clinical significance

Common diseases of the appendix (in humans) are appendicitis and carcinoid tumors (appendiceal carcinoid). Appendix cancer accounts for about 1 in 200 of all gastrointestinal malignancies. In rare cases, adenomas are also present.

Appendicitis

Appendicitis is a condition characterized by inflammation of the appendix. Pain often begins in the center of the abdomen, corresponding to the appendix's development as part of the embryonic midgut. This pain is typically a dull, poorly localized, visceral pain.

As the inflammation progresses, the pain begins to localize more clearly to the right lower quadrant, as the peritoneum becomes inflamed. This peritoneal inflammation, or peritonitis, results in rebound tenderness (pain upon removal of pressure rather than application of pressure). In particular, it presents at McBurney's point, 1/3 of the way along a line drawn from the anterior superior iliac spine to the umbilicus. Typically, point (skin) pain is not present until the parietal peritoneum is inflamed, as well. Fever and an immune system response are also characteristic of appendicitis. Other signs and symptoms may include nausea and vomiting, low-grade fever that may get worse, constipation or diarrhea, abdominal bloating, or flatulence.

Appendicitis usually requires the removal of the inflamed appendix, in an appendectomy either by laparotomy or laparoscopy. Untreated, the appendix may rupture, leading to peritonitis, followed by shock, and, if still untreated, death.

Surgery

The surgical removal of the appendix is called an appendectomy. This removal is normally performed as an emergency procedure when the patient is suffering from acute appendicitis. In the absence of surgical facilities, intravenous antibiotics are used to delay or avoid the onset of sepsis. In some cases, the appendicitis resolves completely; more often, an inflammatory mass forms around the appendix. This is a relative contraindication to surgery.

The appendix is also used for the construction of an efferent urinary conduit, in an operation known as the Mitrofanoff procedure, in people with a neurogenic bladder.

The appendix is also used as a means to access the colon in children with paralysed bowels or major rectal sphincter problems. The appendix is brought out to the skin surface and the child/parent can then attach a catheter and easily wash out the colon (via normal defaecation) using an appropriate solution.

History
Charles Darwin suggested that the appendix was mainly used by earlier hominids for digesting fibrous vegetation, then evolved to take on a new purpose over time. The very long cecum of some herbivorous animals, such as in the horse or the koala, appears to support this hypothesis. The koala's cecum enables it to host bacteria that specifically help to break down cellulose. Human ancestors may have also relied upon this system when they lived on a diet rich in foliage. As people began to eat more easily digested foods, they may have become less reliant on cellulose-rich plants for energy. As the cecum became less necessary for digestion, mutations that were previously deleterious (and would have hindered evolutionary progress) were no longer important, so the mutations survived. It is suggested that these alleles became more frequent and the cecum continued to shrink. After millions of years, the once-necessary cecum degraded to be the appendix of modern humans.

Dr. Heather F. Smith of Midwestern University and colleagues explained:

Recently ... improved understanding of gut immunity has merged with current thinking in biological and medical science, pointing to an apparent function of the mammalian cecal appendix as a safe-house for symbiotic gut microbes, preserving the flora during times of gastrointestinal infection in societies without modern medicine. This function is potentially a selective force for the evolution and maintenance of the appendix.
Three morphotypes of cecal-appendices can be described among mammals based primarily on the shape of the cecum: a distinct appendix branching from a rounded or sac-like cecum (as in many primate species), an appendix located at the apex of a long and voluminous cecum (as in the rabbit, greater glider and Cape dune mole rat), and an appendix in the absence of a pronounced cecum (as in the wombat). In addition, long narrow appendix-like structures are found in mammals that either lack an apparent cecum (as in monotremes) or lack a distinct junction between the cecum and appendix-like structure (as in the koala). A cecal appendix has evolved independently at least twice, and apparently represents yet another example of convergence in morphology between Australian marsupials and placentals in the rest of the world. Although the appendix has apparently been lost by numerous species, it has also been maintained for more than 80 million years in at least one clade.

In a 2013 paper, the appendix was found to have indepedently evolved in different animals at least 32 times (and perhaps as many as 38 times) and to have been lost no more than six times over the course of history.  A more recent study using similar methods on an updated database yielded similar, though less spectacular results, with at least 29 gains and at the most 12 losses (all of which were ambiguous), and this is still significantly asymmetrical. This suggests that the cecal appendix has a selective advantage in many situations and argues strongly against its vestigial nature. This complex evolutionary history of the appendix, along with a great heterogeneity in its evolutionary rate in various taxa, suggests that it is a recurrent trait.

Such a function may be useful in a culture lacking modern sanitation and healthcare practice, where diarrhea may be prevalent. Current epidemiological data on the cause of death in developed countries collected by the World Health Organization in 2001 show that acute diarrhea is now the fourth leading cause of disease-related death in developing countries (data summarized by the Bill and Melinda Gates Foundation). Two of the other leading causes of death are expected to have exerted limited or no selection pressure.

Additional images

See also 
 Meckel's diverticulum
 Appendix of the epididymis, a detached efferent duct of the epididymis
 Appendix testis, a vestigial remnant of the Müllerian duct
 Epiploic appendix, one of several small pouches of fat on the peritoneum along the colon and rectum
 Appendix of the laryngeal ventricle, a sac that extends from the laryngeal ventricle
 Mesoappendix, the portion of the mesentery that connects the ileum to the vermiform appendix

References

Further reading 

 Appendix May Actually Have a Purpose—2007 WebMD article
—"Abdominal Cavity: The Cecum and the Vermiform Appendix"
 "The vestigiality of the human vermiform appendix: A Modern Reappraisal"—evolutionary biology argument that the appendix is vestigial
 
 Cho, Jinny.  "Scientists refute Darwin's theory on appendix". The Chronicle (Duke University), August 27, 2009. (News article on the above journal article.)

Digestive system
Vestigial organs